Mātaatua was one of the great voyaging canoes by which Polynesians migrated to New Zealand, according to Māori tradition. Māori traditions say that the Mātaatua was initially sent from Hawaiki to bring supplies of kūmara to Māori settlements in New Zealand. The Mātaatua was captained by Toroa, accompanied by his brother, Puhi; his sister, Muriwai; his son, Ruaihona; and daughter, Wairaka.

Mātaatua Māori include the tribes of Ngāi Tūhoe, Ngāti Awa, Te Whakatōhea, Te Whānau-ā-Apanui, Ngāpuhi, Ngāi Te Rangi, Ngāti Pūkenga.

History

The Mātaatua waka likely arrived in Aotearoa more than a century after the Tainui and Arawa waka.

Bay of Plenty settlement
In local Māori tradition, the Mātaatua waka was the first to land at Whakatāne, approximately 700 years ago. According to various accounts, at some point, a dispute arose between the commander, Toroa, and Puhi, eponymous ancestor of Ngāpuhi, over kūmara planting rituals. As a result, Puhi left on the Mātaatua with most of its crew to travel further north, while Toroa, Tāneatua, Muriwai, and their immediate families remained in the Bay of Plenty. Those that stayed behind settled and intermixed with previously established Māori tribes in the region. People from Ngāi Tūhoe, Ngāti Awa, Te Whakatōhea, Te Whānau-ā-Apanui and the Tauranga Moana tribes can trace their origins to this settlement.

Three members of the crew feature in Bay of Plenty genealogies: Toroa, Tāneatua and Muriwai. These members of the crew and their immediate families integrated with local people who lived in the area, such as Muriwai's daughter Hinekauia who married Tutamure of the Wakanui iwi from Omarumutu.

Northland settlement
Many accounts say that, from the Bay of Plenty, Puhi traveled northward in the Mātaatua, eventually reaching the Bay of Islands in Northland. The Ngāpuhi people can trace their origins to this settlement. Tribes in both the Bay of Plenty and Northland agree that the final resting place of the Mātaatua was at Tākou Bay in the Bay of Islands.

Legacy
Many iwi can trace their origins to ancestors on the Mātaatua canoe. Tribes in both the Bay of Plenty and Northland maintain strong ties, and a reunion was held in 1986. A replica of the Mātaatua rests at the Mataatua Reserve in Whakatāne.

See also
List of Māori waka

References

R.D. Craig, Dictionary of Polynesian Mythology (Greenwood Press: New York) 1989.

 
Māori waka
Māori mythology